Francis Luttrell may refer to:
 Francis Luttrell (1628–1666), MP for Minehead 1660–66
 Francis Luttrell (1659–1690), MP for Minehead 1679–90
 Francis Fownes Luttrell (1756–1823), MP for Minehead 1780–83

See also 
 Feudal barony of Dunster